The  is a railway line operated by West Japan Railway Company (JR West) and Shikoku Railway Company (JR Shikoku) in Japan which links Okayama Station in Okayama Prefecture with Takamatsu Station in Kagawa Prefecture via the Great Seto Bridge. It is not a distinct railway line, but an official nickname given to a composite line formed of three different lines.

Basic data
Operators, lines:
Total distance: 71.8 km
JR West (Services and tracks)
Uno Line 1: Okayama — Chayamachi, 14.9 km
Honshi-Bisan Line: Chayamachi — Kojima, 12.9 km
JR Shikoku (Services and tracks)
Honshi-Bisan Line: Kojima — Utazu, 18.1 km
Yosan Line 1: Utazu — Sakaide — Takamatsu 25.9 km
JR Freight (Services)
Uno Line 1: Okayama — Chayamachi, 14.9 km
Honshi-Bisan Line: Chayamachi — Kojima — Utazu, 31.0 km
Yosan Line 1: Utazu — Sakaide — Takamatsu 25.9 km
1: Only the portions of these lines are called Seto-Ōhashi Line.
Gauge: 
Stations: 22
Track:
Double: Chayamachi — Takamatsu
Single: the remainder
Electrification: 1,500 V DC
Railway signalling: Automatic

Services
As a link between Honshu and Shikoku, the line has many limited express trains, including the Shiokaze, Nanpū, Uzushio, and Sunrise Seto. There are also rapid trains such as the Sun Port and Marine Liner.

The segment operated by JR West (Okayama — Kojima) accepts ICOCA, a smart card ticketing system.

Stations
All trains stop at stations marked "●" and pass stations marked "｜".  
Most trains stop at "▲" and few trains stop at "△"
SK: Shiokaze
NP: Nampū
US: Uzushio
SS: Sunrise Seto
ML: Rapid Marine Liner
SP: Rapid Sun Port

All trains stop at stations marked "●" and pass stations marked "-". Some trains stop at "▲" and few trains stop at △.

See also
List of railway lines in Japan
Tsugaru-Kaikyō Line

External links

 JR Shikoku official website 
 JR West official website 

Lines of Shikoku Railway Company
Lines of West Japan Railway Company
1067 mm gauge railways in Japan